Óscar Sastre (25 December 1920 – 2 August 2012) was an Argentine international footballer.

Career
Sastre was a key player for Club Atlético Independiente as the club won the 1948 Primera División Argentina. He joined Colombian side Deportivo Cali with former Independiente teammate Camilo Cerviño in 1950.

Sastre played for Argentina, winning the Copa América in 1947.

Personal
Sastre's brother, Antonio, was also an Argentine international footballer.

Honours

Club
Independiente
Primera División Argentina: 1948

International
Argentina
Copa América: 1945, 1946, 1947

References

External links
Profile at BDFA

1920 births
2012 deaths
Argentine footballers
Club Atlético Independiente footballers
Deportivo Cali footballers
Argentine Primera División players
Argentina international footballers
Copa América-winning players
Association football wing halves